The following is a list of the monastic houses in Greater Manchester, England.

See also
 List of monastic houses in England

Notes

References

Medieval sites in England
Greater Manchester
Buildings and structures in Greater Manchester
Lists of buildings and structures in Greater Manchester
Greater Manchester